Andrew Mildenhall (born 2 December 1966) is a current English cricketer.  Mildenhall is a right-handed batsman who bowls right-arm fast-medium.  He was born in Swindon, Wiltshire.
He currently plays for the Wiltshire over 50’s.

Mildenhall made his Minor Counties Championship debut for Wiltshire in 1989 against Berkshire. From 1989 to 1990, he represented the county in 6 Minor Counties Championship matches, the last of which came against Droset.  Mildenhall also represented Wiltshire in a single MCCA Knockout Trophy match against Cornwall in 1990.

Mildenhall also represented Wiltshire in 2 List A matches.  His first match came against Warwickshire in the 1989 NatWest Trophy, with his second and last List A match coming against Surrey in the 1990 NatWest Trophy.  In his 2 matches, he scored 5 runs at a batting average of 2.50, with a high score of 3.  With the ball he took a single wicket at a bowling average of 77.00, with best figures of 1/32.

References

External links
Andrew Mildenhall at Cricinfo
Andrew Mildenhall at CricketArchive

1966 births
Living people
Sportspeople from Swindon
People from Wiltshire
English cricketers
Wiltshire cricketers